Ed Card (born December 16, 1946) is an American bobsledder. He competed in the four man event at the 1984 Winter Olympics.

References

1946 births
Living people
American male bobsledders
Olympic bobsledders of the United States
Bobsledders at the 1984 Winter Olympics
People from Hudson, New York